Monolith is a Bulgarian Rock Band, founded in 1991.

Members
Tony Chambera - vocals & guitars
Pavel Vassev - guitars
Emmerich Ambil - bass
Kaloyan Hristov - drums

Discography

1992 "One more chance"
1993 "Heads or Tails"
1994 "Ballads"
1996 "Monolith 3"
1997 "Sisyphus"
1999 "Dr. Rock 'n' Roll"
2002 "Times and mores"
2007 "Vegas Vacation"

Tony Chambera's solo albums
1996 "Alien"
2010 "The voice of Monolith-Tony & friends"

External links 
 Monolith at Bulgarian Rock Archives
 Music and more info on Facebook

Bulgarian rock music groups
1991 establishments in Bulgaria
Musical groups established in 1991